Quilombo is a 1984 Brazilian drama film directed by Carlos Diegues. It was entered into the 1984 Cannes Film Festival. The film is based on the history of the Quilombo dos Palmares, a community of escaped slaves that numbered in the thousands during the 1600s in north-eastern Brazil.

Cast

 Antônio Pompêo - Zumbi
 Zezé Motta - Dandara
 Tony Tornado - Ganga Zumba 
 Vera Fischer - Ana de Ferro
 Antônio Pitanga - Acaiuba
 Maurício do Valle - Domingos Jorge Velho
 Daniel Filho - Carrilho
 João Nogueira - Rufino
 Jorge Coutinho - Sale
 Grande Otelo - Baba
 Joffre Soares - Caninde
 Camila Pitanga
 Jonas Bloch 
 Chico Diaz 
 Léa Garcia 
 Milton Gonçalves 
 Zózimo Bulbul
 Arduíno Colassanti 
 Carlos Kroeber 
 Thelma Reston

See also
List of films featuring slavery

References

External links

1984 drama films
1984 films
Brazilian drama films
Films set in the 1650s
Films set in the 1660s
Films set in the 1670s
Films set in the 1680s
Films set in the 1690s
Films about Brazilian slavery
Films about revolutions
War films based on actual events
Films directed by Carlos Diegues
1980s Portuguese-language films
Magic realism films

Epic films